Erik Pema Kunsang (born Erik Hein Schmidt) is a Danish translator and was, along with Marcia Binder Schmidt, director of Rangjung Yeshe Translations and Publications in Kathmandu.  He has translated over fifty volumes of Tibetan texts and oral teachings.  His other projects include the Rangjung Yeshe Wiki, an ongoing electronic publication that is compiling an extensive glossary of Buddhist terminology to bridge the Tibetan and English languages.

Erik has been the assistant and translator for Tulku Urgyen Rinpoche and his sons since the late 1970s.  He was active in facilitating masters of the Practice Lineages to teach in the West.  He lives in Denmark.

References 
 Interview on Lotsawa School

External links 
 
 Publications website
 Shedrub Development Mandala
 Gomde Denmark
 Gomde USA

This article uses GFDL-licensed material from the Rangjung Yeshe Wiki article Erik Pema Kunsang.

Tibetan Buddhists from Denmark
Buddhist translators
Living people
Nyingma Buddhists
Kagyu Buddhists
Year of birth missing (living people)
Tibetan–English translators